A spatial light modulator (SLM) is an object that imposes some form of spatially varying modulation on a beam of light.  A simple example is an overhead projector transparency. Usually when the term SLM is used, it means that the transparency can be controlled by a computer. In the 1980s, large SLMs were placed on overhead projectors to project computer monitor contents to the screen. Since then, more modern projectors have been developed where the SLM is built inside the projector. These are commonly used in meetings of all kinds for presentations.

Usually, a SLM modulates the intensity of the light beam. However, it is also possible to produce devices that modulate the phase of the beam or both the intensity and the phase simultaneously.

SLMs are used extensively in holographic data storage setups to encode information into a laser beam similarly to way a transparency does for an overhead projector. They can also be used as part of a holographic display technology.

SLMs have been used as a component in optical computing. They also often find application in holographic optical tweezers.

Liquid crystal SLMs can help solve problems related to laser microparticle manipulation. In this case spiral beam parameters can be changed dynamically.

SLMs primarily marketed for image projection, displays devices, and maskless lithography.

Electrically-addressed spatial light modulator (EASLM)

As its name implies, the image on an electrically addressed spatial light modulator is created and changed electronically, as in most electronic displays. EASLMs usually receive input via a conventional interface such as VGA or DVI input. They are available at resolutions up to QXGA (2048 × 1536). Unlike ordinary displays, they are usually much smaller (having an active area of about 2 cm²) as they are not normally meant to be viewed directly. An example of an EASLM is the Digital Micromirror Device at the heart of DLP displays or LCoS Displays using ferroelectric liquid crystals (FLCoS) or nematic liquid crystals (Electrically Controlled Birefringence effect).

Optically-addressed spatial light modulator (OASLM)
The image on an optically addressed spatial light modulator, also known as a light valve, is created and changed by shining light encoded with an image on its front or back surface. A photosensor allows the OASLM to sense the brightness of each pixel and replicate the image using liquid crystals. As long as the OASLM is powered, the image is retained even after the light is extinguished. An electrical signal is used to clear the whole OASLM at once.

They are often used as the second stage of a very-high-resolution display, such as one for a computer-generated holographic display. In a process called active tiling, images displayed on an EASLM are sequentially transferred to different parts on an OASLM, before the whole image on the OASLM is presented to the viewer. As EASLMs can run as fast as 2500 frames per second, it is possible to tile around 100 copies of the image on the EASLM onto an OASLM while still displaying full-motion video on the OASLM. This potentially gives images with resolutions of above 100 megapixels.

Application in ultrafast pulse measuring and shaping

Multiphoton intrapulse interference phase scan (MIIPS) is a technique based on the computer-controlled phase scan of a linear-array spatial light modulator. Through the phase scan to an ultrashort pulse, MIIPS can not only characterize but also manipulate the ultrashort pulse to get the needed pulse shape at target spot (such as transform-limited pulse for optimized peak power, and other specific pulse shapes). This technique features with full calibration and control of the ultrashort pulse, with no moving parts, and simple optical setup. Linear array SLMs that use nematic liquid crystal elements are available that can modulate amplitude, phase, or both simultaneously.

See also
 Active filters in femtosecond pulse shaping

References
Larry J. Hornbeck (TI), Digital Light Processing for High-Brightness, High-Resolution Applications, 21st century Archives 
Coomber, Stuart D.; Cameron, Colin D.; Hughes, Jonathon R.; Sheerin, David T.; Slinger, Christopher W.; Smith, Mark A.; Stanley, Maurice (QinetiQ), "Optically addressed spatial light modulators for replaying computer-generated holograms", Proc. SPIE Vol. '4457', p. 9-19 (2001)
Liquid Crystal Optically Addressed Spatial Light Modulator, 
Slinger, C.; Cameron, C.; Stanley, M.; "Computer-Generated Holography as a Generic Display Technology", IEEE Computer, Volume 38, Issue 8, Aug. 2005, pp 46–53

External links
 9781510613010/10.1117/3.2281295?SSO=1 How to Shape Light with Spatial Light Modulators
 SLM ToolBox A free Windows application for controlling phase-only spatial light modulators.
 Phase calibration of a Spatial Light Modulator

Optical components
Display technology
Optical devices